Stenauxa is a genus of longhorn beetles of the subfamily Lamiinae, containing the following species:

 Stenauxa exigua Aurivillius, 1925
 Stenauxa fasciata Breuning & Téocchi, 1983

References

Parmenini